"You're a Friend of Mine" is a 1985 hit song, written by Narada Michael Walden and Jeffrey Cohen, with lead vocals by Clarence Clemons and Jackson Browne in a duet. At the time of the song's release, Clemons was already well known nationally as the saxophonist in Bruce Springsteen's E Street Band. The song was released on Clemons's solo album Hero of that year. Browne's then-girlfriend Daryl Hannah provides background vocals and appears in the song's music video painting and later filming the duo. Also appearing in the video is a backing band, including songwriter Walden on drums. The B-side was "Let the Music Say It", a non-album track written by Clemons and Michael Jonzun.

The song was a commercial success, reaching the top 20 on the Billboard Hot 100 (#18), Mainstream Rock (#16), and the top 40 on the Adult Contemporary (#21) charts in the U.S.

A live version of the song was recorded on Clemons's 2004 album with Temple of Soul entitled Live in Asbury Park, Vol. 2.

This song was used by the World Wrestling Federation (WWE) in early 1986, to cement a storyline involving a feud between "Rowdy" Roddy Piper and "Ace" Cowboy Bob Orton, culminating with a montage of their work together from 1984 to 1986. It was also used again on 02/03/1989 on NBC's The Main Event to show the close friendships of The Mega Powers: Hulk Hogan, Randy "Macho Man" Savage, and Miss Elizabeth.

Charts

Weekly charts

Year-end charts

References

External links
"You're a Friend of Mine" on YouTube
Song lyrics at SongFacts

1985 singles
Jackson Browne songs
Male vocal duets
Songs written by Narada Michael Walden
Song recordings produced by Narada Michael Walden
Songs written by Jeffrey E. Cohen
1985 songs
CBS Records singles
Songs about friendship